Femoral can refer to: 

Having to do with the femur
Femoral artery
Femoral intercourse
Femoral nerve
Femoral triangle
Femoral vein